Ng'ombeni is a settlement in Kenya's Coast Province.It is a developing town as new business centers are established. Ng'ombeni is also an education center having Ng'ombeni Secondary School, Ng'ombeni Primary, Denyenye Primary, Zibani Primary, Kiteje Primary School, Ningawa Primary School, Waa Boys High School, Hekima Secondary School, and the private school Iqra Junior Academy. Government and Private sectors are looking at ways to fund and establish higher learning institutions and technical colleges in Ngombeni given the need for skilled labor in the rapidly developing county and the areas strategic location.

Away from the main highway, farming is still the main source of income and the government and the private sectors are helping local farmers improve their production capacities.  Some of the places in Ng'ombeni include Mwachileli, Zibani, Ng'ombeni, Denyenye, Magaoni, Bara-arabu, Mwamoro, Mtakuja, Moshini and Ngong'o.  The informal contract sector has also grown exponentially over the last 5 years given all the infrastructure and capital intensive projects in Ngombeni.  This has resulted in the Per-Capital Income growth on average surpassing many other kwale towns and most of Kwale County areas.  Several collective savings projects and increased consumer spending habits have seen a growth in retail and entertainment outlets.

Being strategically located on northern end of the south coast, the new Dongo Kundu by-pass will connect to the Mombasa Lunga-Lunga highway junctions at Ngombeni.  The main highway at this junction has seen the expansion to four lanes.  As a result, light industries, hotels, housing, and commercial interest in the area has risen consistently since 2018.  With the construction of the new Mtongwe-Ganjoni bridge scheduled to replace the aging ferries in Likoni by 2024, traffic to the Economic Zones, Moi International Airport, and the Mombasa Island will only take minutes.  Ngombeni is increasingly becoming a vital logistics center for the Kwale county.

Property developers and the government low income housing initiatives have started looking for opportunities in Likoni and Ngombeni to help easy the growing population and housing pressure experienced on the coast.  Over the last five years, significant housing relocations (due to the by-pass) annexation, has shifted the need for more affordable and environmentally friendly construction.  The cost of building such houses to current building codes is still challenging to the community at large.

The Kwale Development plan outlines the following developments (https://www.youthagenda.org/wp-content/uploads/2019/12/Kwale-County-Annual-Development-Plan-2018.pdf):

i) Investing quality, affordable and accessible health care services through establishment of a County Referral Hospital and
upgrading the sub county hospitals, health centres and dispensaries.
ii) Investing in key infrastructural facilities such as educational (ECDE and Youth Polytechnics), county access roads, water and
sanitation systems, energy, markets and other for rapid economic transformation.
iii) Investing in agricultural transformation and food security through increased extension services, agricultural mechanization,
irrigation, livestock development and fisheries promotion. This will enhance food security, create employment, raise rural
incomes and thus reduce poverty.
iv) Working towards effective management of land and our natural resources, the physical planning of urban areas and trading
centres and investing in land banking for infrastructural development.
v) Investing in social welfare programmes for the women, youth and other vulnerable groups, human capital development
programmes, trade promotion through offering of business capital and others. This will ensure inclusivity, equity and rapid
economic development.

References 

Populated places in Coast Province